Mayotte (Shimaore: Maore, ; Kibushi: Maori), officially the Department of Mayotte, is an overseas department and region and single territorial collectivity of France. It is located in the northern part of the Mozambique Channel in the Indian Ocean off the coast of Southeastern Africa, between Northwestern Madagascar and Northeastern Mozambique. Mayotte consists of a main island, Grande-Terre (or Maore), a smaller island, Petite-Terre (or Pamanzi), as well as several islets around these two. Mayotte is the most prosperous territory in the Mozambique Channel, making it a major destination for immigration.

The biggest city and prefecture is Mamoudzou on Grande-Terre. The Dzaoudzi–Pamandzi International Airport is located on the neighbouring island of Petite-Terre. The territory is also known as Maore, the native name of its main island.

Mayotte is one of the overseas departments of France as well as one of the 18 regions of France, with the same status as the departments of Metropolitan France. It is an outermost region of the European Union and, as an overseas department of France, part of the eurozone.

French is the official language and is spoken as a second language by an increasing part of the population, with 63% of the population 14 years and older reporting in the 2007 census that they could speak it. The native languages of Mayotte are Shimaore, which is the most spoken, and the lesser spoken Kibushi, a Malagasy language, of which there are two varieties, Kibushi sakalava, most closely related to the Sakalava dialect of Malagasy, and Kibushi antalaotsi, most closely related to the dialect spoken by the Antalaotra of Madagascar. Both have been influenced by Shimaore.

The island was populated from neighbouring East Africa with later arrival of Arabs, who brought Islam. A sultanate was established in 1500. The vast majority of the population today is Muslim. In the 19th century, Mayotte was conquered by Andriantsoly, former king of Iboina on Madagascar.

Mayotte chose to remain with France after the Comoros declared its independence following the 1974 referendum. Mayotte became an overseas department on 31 March 2011 and became an outermost region of the European Union on 1 January 2014, following a March 2009 referendum with an overwhelming result in favour of the department status.

The department faces enormous challenges. According to an INSEE report published in 2018, 84% of the population live under the poverty line (established at €959 per month and per household), compared to 16% in metropolitan France, 40% of dwellings are corrugated sheet metal shacks, 29% of households have no running water, and 34% of the inhabitants between the age of 15 and 64 do not have a job. In 2019, with an annual population growth of 3.8%, half the population was less than 17 years old. In addition, as a result of immigration from neighboring islands, 48% of the population were foreign nationals.

Geography 

The term Mayotte (or Maore) may refer to all of the department's islands, of which the largest is known as Maore and includes Maore's surrounding islands, most notably Pamanzi, or only to the largest island. The name is believed to come from Mawuti, contraction of the Arabic  Jazīrat al-Mawt – meaning "island of death" (maybe due to the dangerous reefs circling the island) and corrupted to Mayotta in Portuguese, later turned into French. However, the local name is Mahore, and the Arabic etymology is doubtful.

Because of the volcanic rock, the soil is relatively rich in some areas. A coral reef encircling much of the island ensures protection for ships and a habitat for fish. Dzaoudzi was the capital of Mayotte (and earlier the capital of all the colonial Comoros) until 1977, when the capital was relocated to Mamoudzou on the main island of Grande-Terre. It is described as "the largest barrier-reef-lagoon complex within the southwestern Indian Ocean".

Topography 
Mayotte is the oldest of the four large islands of the Comoros archipelago, a chain of land emerging from a crescent-shaped submarine relief at the entrance to the Mozambique Channel. Located 295 km west of Madagascar and 67 km southeast of Anjouan, sometimes visible at sunset in the shade, it is composed of several islands and islets covered with lush vegetation. The two largest islands are Grande-Terre and Petite-Terre, backed by a coral reef.

This 160 km long coral reef surrounds a 1,100 km2 lagoon, one of the largest and deepest in the world. Part of the barrier reef features a double barrier that is rare on the planet. It protects almost all of Mayotte from ocean currents and waves, except for a dozen passes, including one in the east called the "S-pass". The lagoon, which averages 5 to 10 km wide, is up to 100 meters deep.

It is dotted with about a hundred coral islets, such as Mtsamboro. This reef serves as a refuge for boats and oceanic fauna. The volcanic activity that created the islands makes the soil particularly fertile.

The total area of Mayotte is about 374 km2, which makes it by far the smallest French overseas department (after Martinique, which is three times larger at 1,128 km2). However, this area is difficult to assess accurately, given the number of small uninhabited islets, some of which are completely underwater at high tide, but may reveal significant areas at low tide. The main islands are

 Grande-Terre, 363 km2, is 39 km long and 22 km wide. Its highest points are: Mount Bénara or Mavingoni (660 m), Mount Choungui (594 m), Mount Mtsapéré (572 m), and Mount Combani (477 m). It is home to Mamoudzou, which is the economic capital of Mayotte and houses the departmental council and the prefecture;
 Petite-Terre (or Pamanzi Island), with Dzaoudzi (official capital of Mayotte) and Pamandzi (where the airport is located). It is 11 km2;
 Mtsamboro is the third largest island (2 km2). It is permanently inhabited, mainly by fishermen;
 Mbouzi islet (84 hectares or 0.84 km2) is classified as a nature reserve;
 Bandrélé islet is the fifth largest island;
 Sable Blanc islet is located near the Saziley Marine Park (marine protected area).

Environment

Geology 

Two volcanic centres are reported, a southern one (Pic Chongui) with a breached crater to the NW, and a northern centre (Mont M'Tsapéré) with a breached crater to the south-east. Mont Bénara is on the curving ridge between these two peaks, approximately at the contact point of the two structures. Volcanic activity started about 7.7 million years ago in the south, ceasing about 2.7 million years ago. In the north, activity started about 4.7 million years ago and lasted until about 1.4 million years ago. Both centres had several phases of activity. The most recent age reported for an ash band is 7000 year BP.

Earthquake swarm 
The seismic waves lasted for more than 20 minutes, but despite this, no one felt it.

Marine environment 

Mayotte is surrounded by a typical tropical coral reef. It consists in a large outer barrier reef, enclosing one of the world's largest and deepest lagoons, followed by a fringing reef, interrupted by many mangroves. All Mayotte waters are ruled by a National Marine Park, and many places are natural reserves.

There are at least 250 different species of coral, 760 tropical fish species, and the National Natural Heritage Inventory (INPN) has no fewer than 3,616 marine species, but this is probably a far cry from the actual count. As this region of the world is still poorly inventoried by scientists, the waters of Mayotte continue to harbour many species unknown to science, and allow important scientific discoveries each year.

Terrestrial environment 

Mayotte has a great diversity in its plant life: more than 1,300 species are recorded, half of them being endemic, making this island one of the richest in plant diversity in the world compared to its size. 15% of the island is classified as natural reserve; however, the primal forest now covers barely 5% of the island due to illegal deforestation.

Just like many volcanic islands, Mayotte shelters quite a limited mammal biodiversity, the only native species being flying foxes (Pteropus seychellensis comorensis). However, there are 18 species of reptiles, 23 of terrestrial molluscs, 116 butterflies, 38 dragonflies, 50 grasshoppers, and 150 beetles.

Protected areas
By 2021 there were 30 protected areas on Mayotte, totaling  or 13.94% of Mayotte's land area, and 100% of Mayotte's marine area. Protected areas on Mayotte include Mayotte Marine Natural Park, Pointes et plages de Saziley et Charifou, and Ilôt Mbouzi National Nature Reserve.

On 3 May 2021 the French government created the Forests of Mayotte National Nature Reserve. The reserve consists of 2,801 hectares in six mountain forests, covering 51% of Mayotte's reserve forests and 7.5% of Mayotte's total land area. Areas protected by the reserve include Mount Mtsapéré, Mount Combani, Mount Benara, and Mount Choungui. The purpose of the reserve is to protect the relict primary forests of the island, restore the island's secondary forests, and protect the island's native flora and fauna.

History 

In 1500, the Maore sultanate was established on the island. In 1503, Mayotte was observed and named (firstly Espirito Santo) by Portuguese explorers, but not colonized. The island has known several eras of wealth (especially during the 11th century at Acoua or between 9th and 12th centuries at Dembéni), being an important part of the Swahili coast culture. However, its sister island Anjouan was preferred by international traders due to its better suitability to large boats, and, for a long time, Mayotte remained poorly developed compared to the three other Comoros islands, often being targeted by pirates and Malagasy or Comorian raids.

In the early 19th century, Mayotte was controlled by a mercantile family that claimed Omani origins. The Sultans of Mayotte had political ties with the Anjouan Sultanate during this period. Mayotte was sparsely populated and mainly consisted of Comorian speakers that were politically aligned with the local sultan and the Malagasy who were autonomous.

In 1832, Mayotte was conquered by Andriantsoly, former king of Iboina on Madagascar; in 1833, it was conquered by the neighbouring sultanate of Mwali (Mohéli in French). On 19 November 1835, Mayotte was again conquered by the Ndzuwani Sultanate (Anjouan sultanate in French); a governor was installed with the unusual Islamic style of Qadi (from the Arabic , meaning "judge"). However, in 1836 it regained its independence under a last local Sultan. Andriantsoly won again the island in 1836, but his depopulated and unfortified island was in a weak position towards the sultans of Comoros, Malagasy kings and pirates. Looking for the help of a powerful ally, he began to negotiate with the French, installed in the nearby Malagasy island of Nosy Bé in 1840.

Mayotte was purchased by France in 1841, and integrated to the Crown. In the immediate aftermath, slavery was abolished and laborers were imported to the area to work in fields and plantations. The abolishment of slavery led to several slave-owning elites to leave Mayotte as their authority was undermined. However, the freed slaves were often subsequently forced to work under harsher conditions for the French government or colonists in their plantations. Additionally, many of the imported laborers were victims of the slave trade.

Mayotte therefore became a French island, but it remained an island with a sparse population due to decades of wars, as well as by the exodus of former elites and some of their slaves: most of the cities were abandoned, and nature regained its rights over the old plantations. The French administration therefore tried to repopulate the island, recalling first of all the Mayotte exiles or refugees in the region (Comoros, Madagascar), proposing the former exiled masters return in exchange for compensation, then by inviting wealthy Anjouan families to come and set up trade. France launched some first major works, such as the realization in 1848 of the Boulevard des Crabes connecting the rock of Dzaoudzi to Pamandzi and the rest of Petite-Terre.

As it had done in the West Indies and Réunion, the French government planned to make Mayotte a sugar island: despite the steep slopes, large plantations were developed, 17 sugar factories were built and hundreds of foreign workers (mainly African, in particular Mozambic Makwas) hired from 1851 onwards. However, production remained mediocre, and the sugar crisis of 1883–1885 quickly led to the end of this crop in Mayotte (which had just reached its peak of production), leaving only a few factory ruins, some of which are still visible now. The last sugar plant to be closed was Dzoumogné in 1955: the best preserved, and now heritage, is Soulou, in the west of the island.

At the Berlin conference in 1885, France took control over the whole Comoros archipelago, which was actually already ruled by French traders; the colony took the name of "Mayotte and Dependencies".

In 1898, two cyclones razed the island to the ground, and a smallpox epidemic decimated the survivors. Mayotte had to start from the beginning once again, and the French government had to repopulate the island with workers from Mozambique, Comoros and Madagascar. The sugar industry was abandoned, replaced by vanilla, coffee, copra, sisal, then fragrant plants such as vetiver, citronella, sandalwood, and especially ylang-ylang, which later became one of the symbols of the island.

Mayotte was the only island in the archipelago that voted in referendums in 1974 and 1976 to retain its link with France and forgo independence (with 63.8% and 99.4% of votes respectively). Over twenty UN resolutions have voted not to recognise France's continued rule of Mayotte, while the independent Comoros have never ceased to claim the island. A draft 1976 United Nations Security Council resolution recognising Comorian sovereignty over Mayotte, supported by 11 of the 15 members of the council, was vetoed by France. It was the only time, that France cast a lone veto in the council. The United Nations General Assembly adopted a series of resolutions on the issue, under the pro-Comoros title "Question of the Comorian Island of Mayotte" up to 1995. In the decades since 1995, the subject of Mayotte has not been discussed by the General Assembly, and all the following referendums over Mayotte independence have shown a strong will of Mayotte people to remain French.

Mayotte became an overseas department of France in March 2011 in consequence of a 29 March 2009 referendum. The outcome was a 95.5 percent vote in favour of changing the island's status from a French "overseas community" to become France's 101st département. Its non-official traditional Islamic law, applied in some aspects of the day-to-day life, will be gradually abolished and replaced by the uniform French civil code. Additionally, French social welfare and taxes apply in Mayotte, though some of each will be brought in gradually. Comoros continues to claim the island, while criticising the French military base there.

In 2018, the department experienced civil unrest over migration from the Comoros.

Politics 

The politics of Mayotte takes place in a framework of a parliamentary representative democratic government and of a multi-party system, whereby the President of the Departmental Council is the head of the local assembly. Executive power is exercised by the French government.

Mayotte also sends two deputies to the French National Assembly and two senators to the French Senate. The deputies represent Mayotte's 1st constituency and Mayotte's 2nd constituency.

Unlike the other overseas regions and departments of France, Mayotte possesses a single local assembly, officially called the "Departmental Council" (conseil départemental), which acts both as a regional and departmental council.

The situation of Mayotte proved to be awkward for France: while a significant majority of the local population did not want to join the Comoros in becoming independent of France, some post-colonial leftist or Marxist-Leninist governments voiced criticism of Mayotte's ongoing ties to France. Furthermore, the peculiar local administration of Mayotte, largely ruled by customary Muslim law, would be difficult to integrate into the legal structures of France, not to mention the costs of bringing the standards of living to levels close to those of Metropolitan France. For these reasons, the laws passed by the national parliament had to state specifically that they applied to Mayotte for them to be applicable on Mayotte.

The status of Mayotte was changed in 2001 towards one very close to the status of the departments of France, with the particular designation of departmental collectivity. This change was approved by 73% of voters in a referendum. After the constitutional reform of 2003 it became an overseas collectivity while retaining the title "departmental collectivity" of Mayotte.

Mayotte became an overseas department of France (département d'outre-mer, DOM) on 31 March 2011 following the result of the March 2009 Mahoran status referendum, which was overwhelmingly approved by around 95% of voters. Becoming an overseas department will mean it will adopt the same legal and social system as used in the rest of France. This will require abandoning some customary laws, adopting the standard French civil code, and reforming the judiciary, educational, social and fiscal systems, and will take place over a period of about 20 years.

Despite its domestic constitutional evolution from the status of an overseas collectivity to that of an overseas department, effectively becoming a full constituent territory within the French Republic, with regards to the European Union, Mayotte remained an 'overseas country and territory' (OCT) in association with the Union (as per Article 355(2) TFEU) and not a constituent territory of the European Union in the same way as the other four overseas departments. However following a directive of the European Council in December 2013, Mayotte became an outermost region of the European Union on 1 January 2014. This successful agreement between the 27 member states follows a petition made by the French government for Mayotte to become an integral territory of the European Union nonetheless benefiting from the derogation clause applicable in existing outermost regions, namely Article 349 TFEU, as favoured in a June 2012 European Commission opinion on Mayotte's European constitutional status.

Defence 
Defence of the territory is the responsibility of the French Armed Forces, principally carried out by a Foreign Legion Detachment in Mayotte. One Engins de Débarquement Amphibie – Standards (EDA-S) landing craft is to be delivered to naval forces based in Mayotte by 2025. The landing craft will replace a CTM landing craft currently deployed in the territory, to better support coastal operations. 

About 170 personnel of the National Gendarmerie are stationed in Mayotte while, as of late 2022, the Maritime Gendarmerie operates the patrol boats Odet and Verdon in the territory.

Administrative divisions 

Mayotte is divided into 17 communes. There are also 13 cantons (not shown here). It is the only department and region of France without an arrondissement.

Transport 

 Waterways
 Ferry between Dzaoudzi and Mamoudzou.
 Highways:
 Total: 
 Paved: 
 Unpaved: 
 Ports and harbours:
 Dzaoudzi
 "Longoni" (Koungou)
 Airport: Dzaoudzi Pamandzi International Airport
 With paved runways: 1 (2002)

Economy 

The official currency in Mayotte is the euro.
  		  	
In 2019, the GDP of Mayotte at market exchange rates was €2.66 billion (US$2.98 bn). In that same year the GDP per capita of Mayotte at market exchange rates, not at PPP, was €9,692 (US$10,850), which was eight times larger than the GDP per capita of the Comoros that year, but only 42.8% of the GDP per capita of Réunion and 26.4% of the GDP per capita of Metropolitan France. Living standards are therefore lower than in metropolitan France. At the 2017 census, 10% of dwellings in Mayotte had no electricity, 29% of dwellings had no running water inside the dwelling, and 54% of dwellings had no toilets inside the dwelling.

The economy of Mayotte has grown significantly since the end of the 20th century due to financial transfers from the French central state and the gradual transformation of the territory into a full-fledged French department after a 2009 referendum, with considerable upgrading of public services and infrastructure.

The economy of Mayotte grew by an average of +9.3% per year in real terms from 2001 to 2008, before being affected by the Global Financial Crisis of 2008 and experiencing as a result a recession of −0.4% in 2009. The economy rebounded as early as 2010, driven by the transformation of the territory into an overseas department, decided in a referendum in 2009 and taking effect in 2011. From 2010 to 2017, the economy of Mayotte grew on average by +6.9% per year in real terms, but economic growth slowed to +2.1% in 2018 due to the massive civil unrest experienced by the territory that year, with weeks of demonstrations, roadblocks, and work stoppages paralyzing Mayotte's economy between January and April 2018. Economic growth rebounded to +5.2% in 2019, but Mayotte was affected by the COVID-19 pandemic in 2020, with growth estimated at only +1.1% in 2020.

Thanks to rapid economic growth, Mayotte has begun to catch up with the rest of France in terms of standards of living. Despite high population growth, Mayotte's GDP per capita managed to rise from 15.4% of Metropolitan France's level in 2000 to 27.3% of Metropolitan France in 2017, but this catching-up process has stalled since 2018 due to the civil unrest that took place in Mayotte that year and its economic consequences. Compared to Réunion, Mayotte's GDP per capita rose from 28.7% of Réunion's level in 2000 to 43.7% in 2017, before falling back slightly.

The local agriculture is threatened by insecurity, and due to a more expensive workforce cannot compete on the export ground with Madagascar or the Comoros union. The major economic potential of the island remains tourism, however hampered by delinquency rates.

Demographics 

On 1 January 2023, a record 310,022 people were living in Mayotte (official INSEE estimate). According to the 2017 census, 58.5% of the people living in Mayotte were born in Mayotte (down from 63.5% at the 2007 census), 5.6% were born in the rest of the French Republic (either metropolitan France or overseas France except Mayotte) (up from 4.8% in 2007), and 35.8% were immigrants born in foreign countries (up from 31.7% at the 2007 census, with the following countries of birth in 2007: 28.3% born in the Union of the Comoros, 2.6% in Madagascar, and the remaining 0.8% in other countries).

According to a field study conducted by INSEE in 2015–2016, only 35.6% of the adults (18 y/o and older) living in Mayotte were born in Mayotte of mothers themselves born in Mayotte, whereas 37.4% of the adults were either born in Anjouan (in the Union of the Comoros) or born in Mayotte of mothers born in Anjouan, 13.5% were either born in Grande Comore or Mohéli (in the Union of the Comoros) or born in Mayotte of mothers born in Grande Comore or Mohéli, 7.9% were either born in France (outside of Mayotte) or in Mayotte of mothers born in France (outside of Mayotte), and 5.7% were either born in foreign countries (other than the Comoros) or in Mayotte of mothers born in foreign countries (other than the Comoros).

Most of the inhabitants of the island are culturally Comorians. The Comorians are a blend of settlers from many areas: Arabs, mainland Africans, Iranian traders, and Malagasy. Comorian communities can also be found in other parts of the Comoros chain as well as in Madagascar.

In 2017, mothers born in foreign countries (predominantly the Union of the Comoros) were responsible for 75.7% of the births that took place in Mayotte although many of these births were to French fathers: 58% of children born in Mayotte in 2017 had at least one French parent.

Religions 

The main religion in Mayotte is Islam. The French census does not collect religious data, but the CIA World Factbook estimates that the population is 97% Muslim and 3% Christian.

The main religious minority, Roman Catholicism, has no proper diocese but is served, together with the Comoros, by a missionary jurisdiction, the Apostolic Vicariate of Comoros Archipelago.

Languages 
French is the sole official language of Mayotte. It is the language used for administration, education, most television, and radio, as well as in commercial announcements and billboards.
The native languages of Mayotte are:
Shimaore, a dialect of Comorian (a close relative of Swahili)
Kibushi, a western dialect of Malagasy (the predominant language of Madagascar) heavily influenced by Shimaore and Arabic
Kiantalaotsi, another western dialect of the Malagasy language also heavily influenced by Shimaore and Arabic

Kibushi is spoken in the south and north-west of Mayotte, while Shimaore is spoken elsewhere.

Besides French, other non-indigenous languages are also present in Mayotte:
Arabic, essentially learned in the Quranic schools
various non-Shimaore dialects of the Comorian language, essentially imported by immigrants who have arrived in Mayotte since 1974: Shindzwani (the dialect of Anjouan, or Nzwani), Shingazidja (the dialect of Grande Comore, or Ngazidja), and Shimwali (the dialect of Mohéli, or Mwali).

Shingazidja and Shimwali on the one hand and Shimaore on the other hand are generally not mutually intelligible. Shindzwani and Shimaore are perfectly mutually intelligible.

2012 and 2017 censuses 

No questions regarding the knowledge and/or use of languages were asked in the 2012 and 2017 censuses, and no question relative to languages will be asked in the future censuses of Mayotte, leaving the now quite outdated census data from 2007 as the last official data on the topic of languages. Improvement in schooling has markedly increased French literacy and knowledge since 2007.

2007 census 

At the 2007 census, 63.2% of people 14 years and older reported that they could speak French, with large differences with age. 87.1% of those whose age was 14 to 19 years old reported that they could speak it, whereas only 19.6% of those aged 65 and older reported that they could speak it. 93.8% of the population whose age was 14 or older reported that they could speak one of the local languages of Mayotte (Shimaore, Kibushi, Kiantalaotsi, or any of the Comorian dialects, which the census included in the 'local languages'). 6.2% of the population aged 14 and older reported that they spoke none of the local languages and could speak only French.

2006 survey 
A survey was conducted by the French Ministry of National Education in 2006 among pupils registered in CM2 (equivalent to fifth grade in the US and Year 6 in England and Wales). Questions were asked regarding the languages spoken by the pupils as well as the languages spoken by their parents. According to the survey, the ranking of mother tongues was the following (ranked by number of first language speakers in the total population; note that percentages add up to more than 100% because some people are natively bilingual):
Shimaore: 55.1%
Shindzwani: 22.3%
Kibushi: 13.6%
Shingazidja: 7.9%
French: 1.4%
Shimwali: 0.8%
Arabic: 0.4%
Kiantalaotsi: 0.2%
Other: 0.4%

When also counting second language speakers (e.g., someone whose mother tongue is Shimaore but who also speaks French as a second language) then the ranking became:
Shimaore: 88.3%
French: 56.9%
Shindzwani: 35.2%
Kibushi: 28.8%
Shingazidja: 13.9%
Arabic: 10.8%
Shimwali: 2.6%
Kiantalaotsi: 0.9%
Other: 1.2%

With the mandatory schooling of children and the economic development both implemented by the French central state, the French language has progressed significantly on Mayotte in recent years. The survey conducted by the Ministry of National Education showed that while first and second language speakers of French represented 56.9% of the population in general, this figure was only 37.7% for the parents of CM2 pupils, but reached 97.0% for the CM2 pupils themselves (whose age is between 10 and 14 in general).

Nowadays there are instances of families speaking only French to their children in the hope of helping their social advancement. With French schooling and French-language television, many young people turn to French or use many French words when speaking Shimaore and Kibushi, leading some to fear that these native languages of Mayotte could either disappear or become some sort of French-based creole.

Culture 

Approximately 26% of the adult population, and five times as many women as men, report entering trance states in which they believe they are possessed by certain identifiable spirits (Djinns) who maintain stable and coherent identities from one possession to the next.

Tourism 
The island of Mayotte, which has very varied coastal relief, offers fewer sandy beaches than its neighbors Grande Comore, Mohéli, the Seychelles, Mauritius and Madagascar, but has a great diversity of coastlines and sand colors (black, brown, gray, red, beige, white). Its lagoon is the largest and deepest in this part of the world (and one of the largest on the planet), and its double barrier reef is a biological curiosity that has only a dozen occurrences on our planet, hosting a great diversity of animals, including large cetaceans, which is extremely rare.

Some touristic activities are structured:

 Hiking to the extinct volcano Dziani Dzaha of Petite-Terre and its lake Dziani;
 Hiking to Mount Combani and Mount Choungui;
 Trek to the governor's house;
 Observation of the maki lemurs of the M'Bouzy islet;
 Diving and snorkelling on the coral reef among tropical fish in the "Passe en S", in N'Gouja, Saziley or on the outer barrier ;
 The lagoon allows the observation of green and hawksbill turtles (which come to lay their eggs on deserted beaches), dolphins (common long-billed, spotted, and tursiops in particular), and whales and their calves (which give birth there);
 Nautical activities or relaxation on the many beaches of Mayotte;
 Swimming and visits to the isolated beaches of the northern and southern white sand islets;
 Bivouacs on the deserted islands;
 The Soulou waterfall, on the beach of the same name, is a natural curiosity;
 The Badamiers mudflat, in Petite-Terre, is a marsh rich in biodiversity and beautiful landscapes;
 The wrecks like that of the sailing schooner Dwyn Wen in front of the Badamiers (two masts of which are still standing out of the water);
 The tour of the island by microlight allows you to observe the reefs from the sky;
 The museum of Mayotte, the MuMa at Dzaoudzi, labeled Musée de France.

Several associations such as Les Naturalistes de Mayotte offer guided outings (hikes, visits, bivouacs), and several marine operators accompany tourists to discover the lagoon and in particular its marine mammals, not to mention the many scuba diving clubs.

The departmental committee of tourism of Mayotte is the official body that administers everything related to tourism for the territory of Mayotte. It is in itself the central official authority that oversees the development and enhancement of tourism in Mayotte.

See also 

 Outline of Mayotte
 2008 invasion of Anjouan
 Administrative divisions of France
 Caring for the Lagoon, a documentary on the preservation of Mayotte's lagoon
 List of colonial and departmental heads of Mayotte
 Communications in Mayotte
 Islam in Mayotte
 Islands administered by France in the Indian and Pacific oceans
 Music of the Comoro Islands

General bibliography

Citations

External links

 
 Prefecture website 
 Departmental Council website 
 IleMayotte.com, the Mayotte Portal.
 Mayotte . The World Factbook. Central Intelligence Agency.
 
 Comité du tourisme de Mayotte Official tourism website 
 Mayotte on the Earth Observatory (NASA).

 
1974 establishments in Africa
1974 establishments in France
Comoros archipelago
Dependent territories in Africa
Disputed islands
Disputed territories in Africa
East African countries
French-speaking countries and territories
Irredentism
Island countries of the Indian Ocean
Islands of Africa
Islands of Overseas France
Outermost regions of the European Union
Overseas departments of France
Southeast African countries
States and territories established in 1974
Territorial disputes of France
Territorial disputes of the Comoros